The 1985 Men's Hockey Champions Trophy was the seventh edition of the Hockey Champions Trophy, an international men's field hockey tournament. It took place from 16 to 24 November 1985 in Perth, Western Australia.

The hosts Australia won their third title in a row by finishing first in the round-robin tournament.

Results

Statistics

Final standings

Goalscorers

External links
Official FIH website

Champions Trophy
Champions Trophy
International field hockey competitions hosted by Australia
Champions Trophy (field hockey)
Sports competitions in Perth, Western Australia
1980s in Perth, Western Australia
November 1985 sports events in Australia